Enzo Alejandro Bruno (born 19 March 1987 in San Ignacio, Misiones) is an Argentine footballer, who plays as a midfielder for Chaco For Ever in Argentina.

External links
 
 
 
 
 

1987 births
Living people
Argentine footballers
Argentine expatriate footballers
Sportspeople from Misiones Province
Association football midfielders
Club Atlético Independiente footballers
San Martín de Tucumán footballers
Aldosivi footballers
CSM Unirea Alba Iulia players
Mixto Esporte Clube players
Guaraní Antonio Franco footballers
Crucero del Norte footballers
Fuerza Amarilla S.C. footballers
Chaco For Ever footballers
Liga I players
Argentine Primera División players
Argentine expatriate sportspeople in Romania
Argentine expatriate sportspeople in Brazil
Expatriate footballers in Romania
Expatriate footballers in Brazil